Ali Hared Mohamed " is a Somali politician. He previously served as Minister of Tourism and Wildlife of Somalia under Abdullahi Yusuf Ahmed's presidency. On 9 August 2014, Mohamud was appointed Minister of Health by Prime Minister Abdiweli Sheikh Ahmed. He replaced Ahmed Mohamed Mohamud at the position. Mohamud's term as Minister of Health ended on 12 January 2015, when new Prime Minister Omar Abdirashid Ali Sharmarke appointed Said Hussein Iid as his successor.

References

Living people
Government ministers of Somalia
Year of birth missing (living people)